The 1988 Swedish Golf Tour was the fifth season of the Swedish Golf Tour, a series of professional golf tournaments held in Sweden, Denmark and Finland.

Schedule
The season consisted of 17 events played between May and October.

Order of Merit

References

Swedish Golf Tour
Swedish Golf Tour